The Arianna String Quartet is an American string quartet that has been in-residence at the University of Missouri–St. Louis since 2000. Formed in 1992, the quartet's current members are John McGrosso and Julia Sakharova, violins; Joanna Mendoza, viola; and Kurt Baldwin, cello.

In 1994, the quartet won the Grand Prize in the Fischoff National Chamber Music Competition. The quartet has performed throughout the United States, Mexico, Japan, Canada and France. Reviewing a concert given at Music Mountain Summer Chamber Music Festival in 2004, The New York Times noted that the quartet "played like the good young group that it is", and the Chicago Tribune, reviewing a 2000 concert at the Chicago Cultural Center, wrote that the quartet "makes music with the tonal warmth, fastidious balance, and heightened communication skills of groups many years its senior."

The Arianna String Quartet currently has a long-term contract with Centaur Records, and also recorded for the Albany Records and Urtext Digital Classics labels. For the Centaur Records label, the quartet has recorded the two string quartets of Janáček, the Horn Quintet (K. 407), G minor piano quartet and Clarinet Quintet of Mozart, and the early and middle string quartets of Beethoven. Reviewing the quartet's recording of Beethoven's string quartets Opp. 59, 74, and 95, Jerry Dubins of Fanfare wrote: "I am prepared to state and defend my belief that these may just be the greatest performances of Beethoven's middle quartets in recorded history."

References

External links 
 
 

American string quartets
Musical groups established in 1992
Centaur Records artists
Albany Records artists